Westside High School is a public high school located in Macon, Georgia, United States. The school opened in 1997 and serves grades 9 through 12. It is the largest school in the Bibb County School District.

Athletics
The Westside Seminoles has competed in Division AAAA Region 2 of the Georgia High School Association since the 2012–2013 school year.

References

External links 
 

Public high schools in Georgia (U.S. state)
Schools in Macon, Georgia
Magnet schools in Georgia (U.S. state)